Ben Pollock (born 6 January 1998) is an English professional footballer who most plays as a midfielder for National League North club Boston United.

Career
Pollock spent his youth with Middlesbrough, Leeds United, and Newcastle United, before he signed his first professional contract with Hartlepool United in May 2016 following a successful trial spell. He made his senior debut in a 1–0 defeat to Sunderland U23 in an EFL Trophy group match at Victoria Park on 4 October 2016.

On 27 July 2017, Pollock scored for Grimsby Town in a 7–0 win against Winterton Rangers whilst on trial. During the same pre-season, Pollock also went on trial with Harrogate Town.

In July 2018, Pollock signed for Northern League Division 2 team Billingham Synthonia, after his father, Jamie, took over the club as chairman and manager. While at the club, Pollock made the transition from a defender to a centre midfielder.

On 4 October 2019, following 37 appearances for Billingham Synthonia, Pollock joined National League North side Hereford FC after his move to then EFL League Two side Bury fell through. He was made available for Hereford's FA Cup 3rd Qualifying Round tie at Tamworth the following day. He won the club's Player of the Year award for the 2021–22 season. Pollock announced his departure from the club on 1 June 2022.

Pollock signed for Boston United on 7 June 2022.

Style of play
Pollock is a versatile footballer and can play centre back, right back and centre midfield.

Personal life
Ben's father, Jamie Pollock, is also a former professional footballer. His brother, Mattie Pollock, plays for Watford.

Career statistics

References

1998 births
Living people
Footballers from Bolton
English footballers
Association football defenders
Middlesbrough F.C. players
Leeds United F.C. players
Newcastle United F.C. players
Hartlepool United F.C. players
Dunston UTS F.C. players
Billingham Synthonia F.C. players
Hereford F.C. players
Boston United F.C. players
English Football League players